Rhenish may refer to:

 Rhenish, wine from the Rheinhessen wine region
 Rhenish Missionary Society
 Rhenish newspaper format

Adjective:
 Pertaining to the Rhineland
 Pertaining to the river Rhine
 Pertaining to the Rhenish dialects and languages such as Kölsch or Low Rhenish  
 Pertaining to the German state of Rhineland-Palatinate 

In Music
 Symphony No. 3 (Schumann), known as the "Rhenish" Symphony 

Rhineland